Tacheocampylaea tacheoides is a species of air-breathing, land snail, a terrestrial pulmonate gastropod mollusk in the family Helicidae, the typical snails. This species is endemic to Italy.  Its natural habitats are temperate forests and rocky areas.

References

Tacheocampylaea
Fauna of Italy
Endemic fauna of Italy
Gastropods described in 1909
Taxonomy articles created by Polbot